Black Magic is a British brand of boxed chocolates originally created by Rowntree's in 1933. Sold as an affordable version of an (at that time) otherwise very expensive luxury product, they were marketed as a courtship gift. In the 1970s, the brand was advertised using the slogan "Who knows the secret of the Black Magic box?" The brand is now owned by Nestlé.

Current selection

 Almond Crunch 
 Raspberry Heaven 
 Dreamy Fudge
 Hazelnut Swirl  
 Orange Sensation 
 Caramel Heart 
 Coffee Crescent 
 Pure Black Magic 
 Midnight Truffle

See also 
 Milk Tray

References

External links 
 

Rowntree's brands
Nestlé brands
1933 establishments in the United Kingdom
Chocolate confectionery